Cryptocoryne alba is a flowering plant belonging to the genus Cryptocoryne in the family Araceae.

Habitat
C. alba is found southwest of Sri Lanka where it is under threat.  It grows in deep leaf litter in its natural habitat.

Description
Its leaf and spathe are umber in color.

References

External links
 Bastmeijer, J.D., C. Christensen & N. Jacobsen, 1984, Cryptocoryne alba und ihre Variationsbreite, Aqua-Planta 1-84 : 18–22.  article
 Wit, H.C.D. de, 1975, Cryptocoryne alba de Wit (nov.sp.) en Cryptocoryne bogneri de Wit (nov.sp.), Het Aquarium 45(12) : 326–327.  De Wit

alba
Flora of Sri Lanka